Kim Won-bong (김원봉, 金元鳳 – 1958) was a Korean anarchist, independence activist, communist, and statesman from North Korea.

Biography
Kim Won-bong was born in 1898, in Miryang, Gyeongsangnam-Do province, Korea. His father was Kim Ju-Ik and his mother was Lee Gyeong-Nyeom. Lee died giving birth to Kim Won-bong's brother, Kyung-Bong.

In February 1919, Kim entered the Shinheung Military Academy and underwent military education for six months, after which he dropped out of the academy. On November 9 of the same year, Kim organized a Korean nationalist underground organization known as the Korean Heroic Corps (의열단; 義烈團), with Yang Gun-ho, Gwak Jae-ki, Han Bong-Geun, Kim Ok, and others. Among the Heroic Corps aims were the assassinations of Japanese officials and their collaborators, coupled with attacks on Japanese bases. After assuming the position of leader of the Heroic Corps, Kim Won-Bong found that he could not accomplish the aims of the organization as it did not have a sufficient number of members. As a result, he joined the Whampoa Military Academy in 1926. Kim used the pseudonym "Choi Rim" and organized the Korean National Revolutionary Party, and the Joseon Communist Reconstruction Party.

The Korean National Revolutionary Party was formed in Shanghai in 1935 by a group of left-wing nationalist Korean parties, organized by Kim Kyu-sik, Kim Won-Bong and Cho Soang. On July 10, 1937, at the invitation of the Government of the Republic of China, Kim went to Lushan, the Chinese government's conference site and famed resort. During his time there, Chinese government officials insisted upon associating the united front against Japanese Imperialism. Before his return, Won-bong received extensive funding from the Chinese governor.

Kim Won-Bong served as the deputy commander of the Korean Liberation Army (한국 광복군) of the Provisional Government of the Republic of Korea. After Korean Independence, he returned to Korea with the officials of the Provisional Government of the Republic of Korea on December 3. After the liberation, he attended a meeting with Kim Gu, Kim Kyu-sik and Pak Hon-Yong.

Although Kim was a communist, he did not like regime of Northern Korea, so Kim continued to stay in South after the division of Korea. However, as anti-communist oppression in South Korea increased, he eventually fled to North Korea in 1948. 

Kim Won-Bong married twice. His first wife, Choi Dong-seon, died young. After her death, he married Park Cha-jeong. He had two sons and one daughter: Kim Cheol-Geon (김철건), Kim Joong-Geon (김중건) and Kim Hak-Bong (김학봉), respectively. His pen name was Yaksan (약산 若山), which means "like a mountain".

In 1958, he was purged by Kim Il-Sung. There are many different accounts of Kim's death. According to one, Kim committed suicide by taking cyanide.

Popular culture
 Portrayed by Cho Seung-woo in the 2015 film Assassination.
 Portrayed by Yoo Ji-tae in the 2019 MBC TV series Different Dreams.

See also 
Heroic Corps
Korean Volunteer Corps
Korean independence movement

References 

 
1898 births
1958 deaths
Anti-sadaejuui
Korean independence activists
Korean anarchists
North Korean atheists
Suicides by cyanide poisoning
Korean generals
Kim Kyu-sik
Gimhae Kim clan
Whampoa Military Academy alumni
Members of the 1st Supreme People's Assembly
Members of the 2nd Supreme People's Assembly
1958 suicides
South Korean emigrants to North Korea
Suicides in Korea